Corbetta is a comune (municipality) in the Metropolitan City of Milan in the Italian region Lombardy.

Corbetta is also home of the Sanctuary of the Madonna of Miracles where according to history, a miracle occurred in 1555, when Jesus emerged from a painting of the Infant and healed a local deaf child. The church became a destination for pilgrimages.

Geography

Physical geography
The city of Corbetta has a planned layout, which is typical of the towns of the Po Valley, with forested areas and cultivations occupying roughly three-quarters of the municipality's territory.

A noteworthy aspect of the town is that it is filled with many small streams, helping to shape the typical landscape of Corbetta; these rivers are now in the Parco Agricolo Sud Milano (Natural Preservation South of Milan).

Because of its proximity to the Naviglio Grande, Corbetta is a member of the Polo dei Navigli (i.e. the cultural area surrounding the aforementioned canal) instituted by the Province of Milan.

Corbetta received the honorary title of city with a presidential decree on February 5, 1988.

Climate

Corbetta exhibits the usual climate of Italy's Northern plains: cold winters and warm summers, with rainfall being most common in autumn and spring. The municipality is in Climatic zone E.

Political geography
Corbetta's territory borders Magenta to the West, Robecco sul Naviglio to the Southwest, Cassinetta di Lugagnano and Albairate to the South, Cisliano to the Southeast, Vittuone to the East, and Santo Stefano Ticino and Arluno to the North.

Inside the borders, there are four frazioni (administrative subdivisions): Soriano, Castellazzo de' Stampi, Cerello and Battuello (the last two united in a unique frazione formally called Cerello-Battuello).

History

Pre-Roman and Roman Period
It is quite certain, looking at glass crockery found in the old castle's well, that the first houses in Corbetta were built between the 7th and 6th centuries BC, when a small community of Celto-Ligurian tribes inhabited the area. In the 4th century BC, Celtic tribes called Insubres arrived. In the 2nd century BC, a Roman colony was established with the goal of defending Milan and the territories to the east of the Ticino River from the incursions of Gauls and Burgundians. In fitting with the defensive purpose of the settlement, city walls were constructed that surrounded a third of the local castle. Archeological sites are visible near the local church, including  a Roman altar dedicated to Jupiter and Mani (Sacred Matrons - divinities who were protectors of the family). Archaeologists also found coins displaying the heads of Julius Caesar, Claudius and Trajan. The city's proximity to Milan, which subsequently became an imperial see, favored the development of Curia Picta (i.e. the Roman name for Corbetta), which indicates that there probably was a tribunal located in the settlement (curia meaning "tribunal" in Latin).

Middle Ages
 
As a result of the siege of Milan led by Uraia's Ostrogoths in 539 AD, Corbetta received exiles coming from that city. It was at this time that the spread of Christianity also reached Corbetta; this is attested through the discovery (in 1971) of a pre-Christian Basilica under the church of Saint Vittore. In 569, the arrival of the Lombards brought the first formal legal documents that expressly mention the village. During the 9th century, the village and the castle of Corbetta passed under the lordship of the Archbishop of Milan. In 1037, hostilities between the Archbishop of Milan Aribert and the Holy Roman Emperor Conrad II began. This was significant for Corbetta, because the Holy Roman Emperor, seeing the difficulty of laying siege to Milan, with its multitude of defenders, instead, occupied Corbetta and its castle with his troops.

A century after the occupation by Conrad in 1154, emperor  Frederick I burned the village during his fight with the united communes of Northern Italy. In a document of  1162 - the  actum in loco Corbetta, Frederico imperatore regnante - Corbetta is mentioned for the first time under this name. The population of Corbetta fought in the Milanese army in 1239 against emperor Frederick II.

Visconti period
Following the rising in Milan in 1270, Corbetta became part of the Visconti's dominion, which was almost a return to being under the lordship of an archbishop, as Ottone Visconti was elected archbishop in 1262, effectively making him lord of Milan.

In 1275 Scarsio of Lanfranco from the Borri family, the general captain of Milanese noble exiles, was awarded many estates in the borough of Corbetta for services rendered to Otto and Matteo I Visconti. In July 1289 the representatives of the Republic of Milan and the Marquis William_VII of Montferrat convened in Corbetta with the aim of creating an anti-Visconti alliance. In 1292 Matteo I Visconti resumed power in Milan, and gathered an army at Corbetta to conquer Novara. Visconti's son Galeazzo subsequently became  vicar of Novara. Here in 1299, supporters of Montferrat conspired to conquer the city: Galeazzo Visconti escaped and took shelter in the castle of Corbetta.

At the end of the 13th century painter Simone da Corbetta created frescoes in the church and cloister of Santa Maria dei Serviti in Milan, now conserved in the Pinacoteca di Brera. On 4 January 1363 Magenta and Corbetta were conquered by a British mercenary company hired by the Marquis of Monferrato. In 1376 Gian Galeazzo Visconti was sent by his father Galeazzo II against the Montferrat army in an ill-fated campaign that forced the Visconti to withdraw to Corbetta, where he was besieged.

Gian Galeazzo became the first Duke of Milan in 1385 by removing Corbetta from the jurisdiction of the Burgaria, placing it under the Podestà of Milan's together with Cisliano, Sedriano, Bareggio, San Vito, Bestazzo and San Pietro di Bestazzo. This political grouping threatened to collapse due to the terrible governing by his son Giovanni Maria. He was killed by  his opponents on the threshold of the church of San Gottardo in Milan on 16 May 1412.

Sforza and Italian Wars
With the climb to the power of Francesco I Sforza, Corbetta changed the lordship and was faithful also to the new princes. In 1499 the French troops of Louis XII invaded the Duchy of Milan. After a series of long wars, Milan, and  orbetta with it, became Spanish possessions in 1535

16th-18th centuries
On 22 November 1577 Charles Borromeo consecrated the new bells of the church. He visited Corbetta again in  1581. In 1582 the population of Corbetta rebelled against the Spanish rule.

In 1631 the German troops, returning from the siege of Mantua, pillaged of the area. In 1650 the castle, already partially ruined, was dismantled; what remained was used to build some palaces in the nearby.

During Austrian rule in Lombardy,  baroques villas were built in Corbetta. The parochial church was built after Napoleonic troops occupied Italy.

From the Battle of Magenta to contemporary period
On 3 June 1859, to the eve of the battle of Magenta, the Massari Villa of Corbetta was one of the headquarters of the Austrian Feldmareshall Ferencz Gyulaj. The 2nd division of Austro-Hungarian cavalry of the VII Army Corps, at the orders of Feldmareshall Lieutenant von Lilia, was quartered in the garden and the stables of the castle

In 1866 a body of the National Guard was garrisoned in the Castle: 150 men divided in four squads under the command of captain Dario Chierichetti.
In the 1880s, with the peasants reduced to hunger from the "pendizzi" (debits but also "appendici" in contracts of rent) and from low wages, also exasperated because of ill-fated vintage years and unexpected deaths of silk worms, often the only source of maintenance for their families came down in public square against the landowners. . On 19 May 1889, in front of the Town hall of Corbetta (then situated in Via Cavour), the police officers shot on the crowd killing one person, injuring at least seven and arresting twenty-one. In 1891 the new church was inaugurated, but the collapse of the bell tower at the costt of nine lives (2 June 1902) delayed the completion until 1908. During World War I, 158 soldiers from Corbetta died.

In 1921 the municipality had 7,689 inhabitants. The country's urban planning changed radically due to industrialization, with workers migrating to those towns where industries sprang up. In Corbetta, many workers still found employment in agriculture.

In August 1944 on orders of German captain Theo Saevecke, responsible for the Massacre of Loreto square in Milan, eight civilians including the local partisan Pierino Beretta were killed as reprisal for partisan attacks on German troops.

After the end of World War II Corbetta experienced an economic boom. Corbetta's importance increased, and it became one of the greater naturalistic and cultural centers of the Province of Milan, especially in the 1980s.  On 5 February 1988 Corbetta was designated a city by the president of the Italian Republic Francesco Cossiga.

Today Corbetta is consolidating more and more like cultural and naturalistic pole, and in order to render these prerogatives in 2007 still more realistic it has taken to the way the plan "ecosustainability", than the scope is proposed to render the common note ecosostenibile to low environmental impact them.

Demographics
In the latest census of 2001, Corbetta had 13,735 inhabitants, subdivided into 6,664 males and 7,071 females. Throughout its known history, the city has usually exhibited moderate growth. A peak in population growth occurred from 1881 to 1911, during which time the local industrialization brought in new citizens and new workplaces. There was a period of stasis in population growth during the two World Wars. A resumption in growth occurred with an economic boom (from 1951 to 1971). The two most recent censuses have each recorded a small increase of approximately 500 residents. From 2001 until the present, the population has grown more than 18,000, with the construction of new residential complexes in the city and its frazioni.

Historic buildings
Marian sanctuary of the Madonna of the Miracles
Palazzo Brentano

References